Senft is a German surname. Notable people with the surname include:

 Adam Senft, protagonist of Dark Hollow
 David Senft, member of the American band Darlingside
 Didi Senft (born 1952), German cycling celebrity
 Frederick Senft, founder of the Altoona Alliance Church
 Gabrielle Senft (born 1997), Canadian rugby union player
 Haro Senft (1928–2016), German filmmaker
 Jim Senft, founder of the Canadian theatre company Summerstock Conservatory
 Lauren Senft (born 1987), Canadian ice dancer
 Michael Senft (born 1972), German canoeist
 Riley Senft (born 1979), Canadian activist
 Simon Senft (born 1982), German fencer

German-language surnames